Medley Footbridge is a pedestrian bridge across the River Thames near the village of Binsey in Oxford, England. It is also known as Rainbow Bridge, although there is another bridge of that name in the University Parks in Oxford.

The bridge bears a plaque with a misspelling which apparently gave rise to a third name, the 'Subscription Bridge':

A second plaque, using the name Rainbow Bridge, records its restoration in 1997.

The bridge joins the west bank of the river to Fiddler's Island in the stream. There is another bridge linking the island to the east bank, just above the point at which the Castle Mill Stream diverges to the east of the navigable channel. The name Medley for the west bank of the Thames at this point designates the 'middle island' between Osney and Binsey.

See also
Crossings of the River Thames

References

External links
 

Bridges completed in 1865
1865 establishments in England
Pedestrian bridges across the River Thames
Bridges in Oxford
Arch bridges in the United Kingdom